Nathan Homer Knorr (April 23, 1905 – June 8, 1977) was the third president of the incorporated Watch Tower Bible and Tract Society, becoming so on January 13, 1942, replacing Joseph Franklin Rutherford, who had served in the position since 1917.

Early life and education
Nathan Knorr was born in Bethlehem, Pennsylvania. He began to show interest in the International Bible Students at age 16. He left the Reformed Church in 1922. He was baptized on July 4, 1923 as a Bible Student following a baptism talk by Frederick W. Franz, with whom Knorr became close friends. Knorr became a volunteer at the Watch Tower headquarters in Brooklyn on September 6, 1923. He became its factory manager in September 1932.

On January 11, 1934, at age 28, Knorr was elected director of the Peoples Pulpit Association (now Watchtower Bible and Tract Society of New York, Inc.). He was made its vice president in 1935. In January 1942, Knorr became president of the International Bible Students Association and the corporations now known as the Watch Tower Bible and Tract Society of Pennsylvania, and Watchtower Bible and Tract Society of New York. Knorr married Audrey Mock in 1953.

Jehovah's Witnesses
Knorr contributed significantly to Jehovah's Witnesses, with an intense educational focus. Within a month of his taking office, arrangements were made for an Advanced Course in Theocratic Ministry, a school that featured Bible research and public speaking. On September 24, 1942, Knorr suggested that the Society establish another school to train missionaries for service in foreign countries. The suggestion was unanimously approved by the board of directors. The first class of the Gilead School—the name given to this missionary school—commenced February 1, 1943.

Knorr arranged for the creation of new branch offices in many countries. In 1942, when he became president, there were 25 branch offices worldwide. By 1946, despite the events of World War II, the number of branch offices increased to 57. Over the next 30 years, the number of branch offices increased to 97.

Knorr began a campaign of real estate acquisition in Brooklyn to expand the organisation's world headquarters, expanded printing production throughout the world, and organized a series of international assemblies that dwarfed those of Rutherford in the 1920s. In 1958, more than 253,000 Witnesses gathered at two New York City venues, Yankee Stadium and the Polo Grounds, for an eight-day convention where more than 7000 were baptized. Other large conventions were held in the US, Canada and Germany.

The doctrine of not accepting blood transfusions was also introduced during Knorr's leadership.

Organizational adjustments
From October 1, 1972, adjustments began in the oversight of the congregations of Jehovah's Witnesses. The writing of Aid to Bible Understanding led to a new understanding of the Bible's mention of elders and "older men" and seems to have been the catalyst for the denomination to adjust its organizational structure.) A revision to the Watchtower Society's organizational manual in 1972 explained, "it is noteworthy that the Bible does not say that there was only one 'older man', one overseer, in each congregation. Rather, it indicates that there were a number of such." 

There would no longer be one congregation servant, or overseer, but a body of elders and ministerial servants. One elder would be designated chairman, but all the elders would have equal authority and share the responsibility for making decisions.

Later, the chairmanship of the Governing Body was affected, rotating in alphabetical order. In December 1975, leadership of the Jehovah's Witnesses passed from the president of the Watch Tower Society to the Governing Body of Jehovah's Witnesses. Beginning January 1, 1976, the Governing Body formed several committees to oversee publishing, writing, teaching, service and personnel. Knorr worked with the new arrangement, until illness shortly before his death forced his move from the world headquarters in Brooklyn, New York. Following Knorr's death in June 1977, Frederick William Franz succeeded him as corporation president.

Death
Knorr died on June 8, 1977 from a cerebral tumor while receiving hospice care at an extension of world headquarters, Watchtower Farms in Wallkill, New York.

Publications
Publications used by Jehovah's Witnesses that were released during Knorr's tenure include:
"All Scripture Is Inspired Of God And Beneficial"
Awake! magazine, which replaced Consolation
"Equipped For Every Good Work"
From Paradise Lost to Paradise Regained
"Let God Be True"
"Make Sure Of All Things"
New World Translation of the Holy Scriptures

See also
 Jehovah's Witnesses publications
 Organizational structure of Jehovah's Witnesses 
 List of Watch Tower Society publications

References

External links

Watch Tower Society presidents
People from Bethlehem, Pennsylvania
American Jehovah's Witnesses
Members of the Governing Body of Jehovah's Witnesses
1905 births
1977 deaths
People from Wallkill, Orange County, New York
Former Calvinist and Reformed Christians
Converts to Jehovah's Witnesses